Emil Ruusuvuori was the defending champion but withdrew from the tournament before his first round match.

Alex Molčan won the title after defeating João Sousa 6–3, 6–2 in the final.

Seeds

Draw

Finals

Top half

Bottom half

References

External links
Main draw
Qualifying draw

Tali Open - 1